Country & Western – Golden Hits is a studio album recorded and released in 1959 by U. S. entertainer Connie Francis.

The album is a tribute to the great Country music stars of the era, such as Hank Williams and Don Gibson.

The album was re-packaged with a new cover design and re-released in March 1962.

Track listing

Side A

Side B

References

Connie Francis albums
MGM Records albums
1959 albums
Covers albums
Albums arranged by Ray Ellis
Albums produced by Ray Ellis
Country albums by American artists